Infection vector may refer to:

 Vector (epidemiology), the method by which a disease spreads
 Vector (malware), the method by which a computer virus spreads

See also 

 Vector (disambiguation)